Mehmet Arif Bey (1882 – 13 July 1926), also known as "Ayıcı" Arif ("Bear-Leader Arif"), was an officer of the Ottoman Army and the Turkish Army.

Works
Anadolu İnkılabı ve Mücahedat-ı Milliye Hatırası (1335 - 1339) (reprinted as Anadolu İnkılabı ve Millî Mücadele Anıları (1919-1923), Arba Yayınları, 1987.)

Medals and decorations
 Gallipoli Star (Ottoman Empire)
 Silver Medal of Liyaqat
 Prussia Iron Cross
 Medal of Independence with Red Ribbon and Citation

See also
 List of high-ranking commanders of the Turkish War of Independence

Sources

External links

Mustafa Armağan, Zafersiz kahraman İnönü, Zaman, 21 February 2010 .

1882 births
1926 deaths
People from Adana
Ottoman Military Academy alumni
Ottoman Military College alumni
Ottoman Army officers
Ottoman military personnel of the Balkan Wars
Ottoman military personnel of World War I
Turkish military personnel of the Greco-Turkish War (1919–1922)
Turkish Army officers
Deputies of Eskişehir
People executed for treason against Turkey
20th-century executions for treason
Executed military personnel
Executed Turkish people
Recipients of the Liakat Medal
Recipients of the Iron Cross (1914)
Recipients of the Medal of Independence with Red Ribbon (Turkey)
People executed by Turkey by hanging